Ana Lupaș (born 1940, Cluj) is a Romanian installation artist, textile artist, and photographer. She studied at the Institute of Fine and Decorative Art in Cluj-Napoca. She first exhibited her art in 1965 at the National Exhibition for Decorative Arts, Bucharest. In 2016 her work was exhibited at the Museion, Museo d'Arte Moderna e Contemporanea in Bolzano, Italy. The same year the Tate purchased her large scale work "The Solemn Process
1964–2008 (1964–74/76; 1980–5; 1985–2008)". The work took five decades to complete and was first shown in 2008 at Taxispalais in Innsbruck.  The Solemn Process included mixed media of, straw, metal and photographs, and used local workers to help build and pose with some of the sculptures, which were eventually included in the art piece itself. As years went by, some sculptures had to be re-built into longer lasting materials. Lupaș wanted to mimic the harvesting process of Romania, as well as illustrating that art itself, can be an evolving process.

As early as the 1960s, Lupaș became interested in the expressive power of textiles and the relationship between object and body covering. Near the end of the decade, Lupaș began working on two specific pieces that would capture this idea. She began working on the series Identity Shirts in 1969. This series used "pieces of cloth...overwritten like palimpsests with the sewing machine, with pens, with ink, and even with blood." She is also well known for Humid Installation (1970), which affirmed her interest in depicting her native Romania's farming culture. She currently lives in Cluj-Napoca.

References

External links 
 images of The Solemn Process at the Tate

1940 births
Living people
Artists from Cluj-Napoca
Contemporary artists
20th-century Romanian women artists
21st-century Romanian women artists